Conduritol or 1,2,3,4-cyclohexenetetrol is any of the organic compounds with chemical formula C6H10O4, that can be seen as derivatives of cyclohexene with four hydroxyl groups (OH) replacing hydrogen atoms on the four carbon atoms not adjacent to the double bond. They are therefore cyclic polyols or cyclitols.

The compounds in this group exhibit cis–trans isomerism, with six isomers that differ by the relative positions of the hydroxyls compared to the mean plane of the ring. In addition, some of these can exist as two distinct enantiomers.

Only the A and B isomers have been found in nature. The first conduritol was isolated in 1908 by K. Kübler from the bark of the vine Marsdenia cundurango, hence its name. A number of conduritol derivatives has antifeedant, antibiotic, tumour-inhibitory, antileukemic, and growth-regulating activity.

See also
 Inositol

References

Cyclitols
Cyclohexenes